Al-Ayfūʿ is a sub-district located in the Al-Mawasit District, Taiz Governorate, Yemen. Al-Ayfūʿ had a population of 11,452 according to the 2004 census.

Villages
Al-Wahbanah
Naḥmah
Ḥazman Asfal
Ḥazman Aʿla
Saqman
Bani Jabir
Ash-Shoʿub
 Al-Fawadaʿ
Kharah
 Garzabah
 Wadi as-Sulam
 Wadi ʿAden
 Al-Maʿmariah

References

Sub-districts in Al-Mawasit District